is a town in the district of Steinfurt, in North Rhine-Westphalia, Germany. It is situated near the junction of the Mittellandkanal and the Dortmund-Ems Canal, approx. 10 km east of Rheine.

Parts of Hörstel are Riesenbeck, Dreierwalde, Birgte and Bevergern

Sports 
[[S.C.Hörstel-Arena (Waldstadion)]] home of 
[[S.C.Hörstel 1921 e.V.]]

Gallery

People 
 Georg Hermes (1775-1835), Roman Catholic theologian
 Clemens Heereman von Zuydwyck (1832-1903), farmer and politician (Zentrum)
 Constantin Heereman von Zuydtwyck (1931-2017), farmer, forester and politician (CDU)
 Norbert Klemens Strotmann Hoppe (born 1946), Roman-catholic bishop
 Karl-Josef Laumann (born 1957), politician (CDU)
 Peter Niemeyer (born 1983), football player and manager

References

Steinfurt (district)